Hans Pössenbacher (14 July 1895 – 24 February 1979) was an Austrian-born German actor.

Filmography

References

External links
 

1895 births
1979 deaths
German male film actors
Actors from Graz
20th-century German male actors